Broughton West is a former civil parish (now part of Duddon civil parish) in the South Lakeland district of Cumbria, England. In the 2001 census the parish had a population of 954, decreasing at the 2011 census to 912. The parish includes the town of Broughton in Furness, the small village of Foxfield, and the hamlets of Bank End, Lower Hawthwaite and Broughton Mills.

Governance
An electoral ward in the name of Broughton exists. This ward stretches north into the Lake District with a total population taken at the 2011 census of 2,205.

See also

Listed buildings in Broughton West

References

Former civil parishes in Cumbria